Fetlar is one of the North Isles of Shetland, Scotland, with a usually resident population of 61 at the time of the 2011 census. Its main settlement is Houbie on the south coast, home to the Fetlar Interpretive Centre. Other settlements include Aith, Funzie, Herra and Tresta.

History
One of the strange features of Fetlar is a huge wall that goes across the island known as the Funzie Girt or Finnigirt Dyke. It is thought to date from the Mesolithic period. So sharp was the division between the two halves of the island that the Norse talked of East and West Isle separately.

Another attraction on the island is the Gothic Brough Lodge, built by Arthur Nicolson in about 1820, and which is undergoing restoration by the Brough Lodge Trust. The Fetlar sheepdog trials take place annually, normally in July. The Fetlar Foy, once very popular with Shetlanders and tourists alike, took place at midsummer on the Links at Tresta where folk were entertained with music, food and drink.

Famous son
Its most famous son was Sir William Watson Cheyne Bt FRS FRCS, a close associate of Lord Lister and one of the pioneers of antiseptics. He was professor of surgery at King's College London, President of the Royal College of Surgeons of England and wrote many books on medical treatments. He was made a baronet for services to medicine in 1908, and later was an MP—first for the Universities of Edinburgh and St Andrews, and then for the Combined Scottish Universities—between 1917 and 1922. He was Lord Lieutenant of the Shetland Islands from 1919 to 1930. Cheyne died on Fetlar on 19 April 1932.

Fetlar was home to the Society of Our Lady of the Isles, an Anglican religious order for women, until it moved to Unst in 2015.

Fishing and shipwrecks
The island has a long tradition of fishing. According to Guinness World Records, in August 2012 what was then the oldest message in a bottle, released in June 1914, was found by Andrew Leaper, skipper of the Copious, coincidentally the same fishing vessel involved in a previous record recovery in 2006. The bottle, and Mr Leaper's World Record certificate, have been donated to the Fetlar Interpretative Centre. Fetlar also has an international selection of shipwrecks including Danish, Dutch, German, English and Soviet vessels.

Geography and geology
Fetlar has a very complex geology, including gneiss in the west, metamorphosed gabbro and phyllite, and kaolin. There is also antigorite and steatite here. Talc was mined here. The east of the island is part of the Shetland ophiolite complex (a section of the Earth's oceanic crust and the underlying upper mantle that has been uplifted and exposed above sea level).

Fetlar is surrounded by a number of small islands, particularly in the sound between it and Unst. These include to the north: Daaey, Haaf Gruney, Sound Gruney, Urie Lingey and Uyea; and to the west: Hascosay and Linga.

It is separated from Hascosay and Yell by Colgrave Sound. Much further to the south are the Out Skerries and Whalsay.

Etymology
There are three island names in Shetland of unknown and possibly pre-Celtic origin: Fetlar, Unst and Yell. The earliest recorded forms of these three names do carry Norse meanings: Fetlar is the plural of fetill and means "shoulder-straps", Omstr is "corn-stack", and í Ála is from ál meaning "deep furrow". However, these descriptions are hardly obvious ones as island names, and are probably adaptations of a pre-Norse language. This may have been Pictish but there is no clear evidence for this. Haswell-Smith suggests a meaning of "prosperous land" and that the island's name may mean "two islands strapped together" by the Funzie Girt. It was recorded as "Fötilør" in 1490, and as "Pheodor Oy" in 1654.

Nature and conservation
Fetlar's wildlife is as varied as its geology. For example, over two hundred species of wild flower have been identified here. The island is known as "The Garden of Shetland", due to its highly fertile soil.

The northern part of Fetlar is a RSPB reserve, home to several important breeding species including Arctic skuas and Eurasian whimbrels. The Lamb Hoga peninsula and nearby Haaf Gruney have some of the largest colonies of European storm petrel. In total the island supports 20,000 individual seabirds, including nationally important populations of Arctic skua, Northern fulmar, great skua, Arctic tern and red-necked phalarope. Of greatest importance are red-necked phalaropes, for which the Loch of Funzie is the most important breeding site in the United Kingdom, and for a while during the 1990s was the only breeding site in the country. A pair of snowy owls famously bred here in the 1960s and early 1970s, they lasted until the 1980s but are no longer present. However, a snowy owl was spotted on Fetlar in October 2018.

Fetlar, and the seas around it, hold several overlapping conservation designations:
The Fetlar to Haroldswick Nature Conservation Marine Protected Area protects  of sea. It completely surrounds Fetlar, and extends to cover all sea between the islands and the neighbouring islands of Yell and Unst from the Colgrave Sound to Haroldswick.

Infrastructure
Ferries sail daily from Hamars Ness on Fetlar to Gutcher on Yell, and to Belmont on Unst. A new breakwater and berthing facility was added at Hamars Ness, and was officially opened on 1 December 2012.

There is a communications tower on Fetlar at: 60°36'5.39"N, 0°55'35.44"W. Fetlar is "Under Evaluation" for superfast broadband according to Digital Scotland.

Fetlar has a small airstrip with a gravel runway. There are no longer scheduled air services to the island.

Community development
Fetlar Developments Ltd (FDL), a company limited by guarantee and a registered charity, was set up by the community to counter the depopulation of the island, which had fallen to just 48 in early 2009, when the 2001 total had been 86. The development company continue to work towards securing a sustainable future for the island both socially and economically.

Work to install three wind turbines in a Community wind energy project began in December 2015.

School
In 2009 there were 3 primary pupils and 1 nursery pupil at Fetlar primary school, situated at Baela near Houbie.

See also

List of islands of Scotland

Notes

References

Gammeltoft, Peder (2010) "Shetland and Orkney Island-Names – A Dynamic Group". Northern Lights, Northern Words. Selected Papers from the FRLSU Conference, Kirkwall 2009, edited by Robert McColl Millar.

External links

Fetlar community website

 
Islands of Shetland
Royal Society for the Protection of Birds reserves in Scotland
Parishes of Shetland
Nature Conservation Marine Protected Areas of Scotland
Special Areas of Conservation in Scotland
Special Protection Areas in Scotland